Kuharu is a village  in Mandawa, Jhunjhunu district of Rajasthan in India. It is part of the Shekhawati region. Kuharu is situated 195 km off Jaipur in the north. The town lies between latitude 28°.06’ in the north and longitude 75°.8’ in the east.

References 

Villages in Jhunjhunu district